

Earl Edmond "Dutch" Mueller (died June 4, 1932) was an American college basketball player.  He was the 1925 national player of the year as a center at Colorado College.

Mueller, from Saint Joseph, Missouri, was an early college basketball standout at Colorado College in Colorado Springs, Colorado.  He played two seasons for the Tigers, leading the team to two Colorado–Wyoming Conference titles.  Mueller played the center position and was known for his ball-handling and pivot play.  He was retroactively named an All-American and national player of the year for 1925 by the Helms Athletic Foundation in 1943.

Following the completion of his college career, Mueller returned to his hometown and played Amateur Athletic Union basketball with Hillyard, Inc.  Mueller won an AAU championship with Hillyard in 1926.

Mueller died in 1932 after an appendix operation.  He was inducted into the National Association of Intercollegiate Athletics (NAIA) Hall of Fame in 1952.

References

Year of birth missing
1932 deaths
All-American college men's basketball players
Amateur Athletic Union men's basketball players
Basketball players from Missouri
Centers (basketball)
Colorado College Tigers men's basketball players
American men's basketball players